In human anatomy, the superior epigastric veins are two or more venae comitantes which accompany either superior epigastric artery before emptying into the internal thoracic vein. They participate in the drainage of the superior surface of the diaphragm.

Structure

Course 
The superior epigastric vein originates from the internal thoracic vein. The superior epigastric veins first run between the sternal margin and the costal margin of the diaphragm, then enter the rectus sheath. They run inferiorly, coursing superficially to the fibrous layer forming the posterior leaflet of the rectus sheath, and deep to the rectus abdominis muscle.

The superior epigastric veins are venae comitantes of the superior epigastric artery, and mirror its course.

Distribution 
The superior epigastric veins participate in the drainage of the superior surface of the diaphragm.

Fate 
The superior epigastric veins drain into the internal thoracic vein.

See also 
Terms for anatomical location

References

External links 
  - "Incisions and the contents of the rectus sheath."
  - "Venous Drainage of the Anterior Abdominal Wall"

Veins of the torso